Tahmeed Rahman (born 26 September 1998) is an Indian cricketer. He made his List A debut for Nagaland in the 2018–19 Vijay Hazare Trophy on 19 September 2018. He made his first-class debut for Nagaland in the 2018–19 Ranji Trophy on 1 November 2018. In round five of the 2018–19 Ranji Trophy, in the match against Manipur, Rahman took a hat-trick. He made his Twenty20 debut for Nagaland in the 2018–19 Syed Mushtaq Ali Trophy on 21 February 2019.

References

External links
 

1998 births
Living people
Indian cricketers
Nagaland cricketers
Place of birth missing (living people)